The 1973 Torneo Godó or Trofeo Conde de Godó, also known as the Spanish Open Championships, was a men's tennis tournament that took place on outdoor clay courts at the Real Club de Tenis Barcelona in Barcelona, Spain. It was the 21st edition of the tournament and was part of the 1973 Grand Prix circuit. It was held from 8 October until 14 October 1973. First-seeded Ilie Năstase won the singles title.

Finals

Singles

 Ilie Năstase defeated  Manuel Orantes 2–6, 6–1, 8–6, 6–4
 It was Năstase's 13th singles title of the year and the 34th of his career.

Doubles

 Ilie Năstase /  Tom Okker defeated  Antonio Muñoz /  Manuel Orantes 4–6, 6–3, 6–2

References

External links
 ITF tournament edition details
 ATP tournament profile
 Official tournament website

Barcelona Open (tennis)
Torneo Godo
Torneo Godo
Torneo Godo